Georges Récipon (January 17, 1860 - May 2, 1920),  son of the Odiot goldsmith / silversmith Paul Edmond Récipon (1832–1898), was a French painter and sculptor whose major work is probably his sculpture at the Grand Palais in Paris, two monumental and exuberant quadrigas on the building's roof.

Other work includes:

 Equestrian statue of General Lariboisiere, Fougères, France)
 Nymphs of the Neva and Nymphs of the Seine groups at the Pont Alexandre III, Paris

References

External links 

 http://odiot.com/en/

1860 births
1920 deaths
French architectural sculptors
20th-century French sculptors
19th-century French sculptors
French male sculptors
19th-century French male artists